"The Hub" is the ninth episode in the fourth season of the re-imagined Battlestar Galactica TV series. It first aired on television in the United States on June 6, 2008. The survivor count shown in the title sequence is 39,673.

Plot
A cold open reviews some of the events of the previous episode, Sine Qua Non. Text reading "Two Days Ago" picks up the story of President Laura Roslin and the other human beings aboard the damaged Cylon basestar. As the Cylon hybrid is reconnected, it cries out "Jump!" The ship jumps to an empty part of space.  During the jump, Roslin finds herself aboard a dark, empty Galactica. Priestess Elosha, who died in the Season 2 two-part episode, Home, appears. She and Roslin embrace. Roslin admits she feels at home aboard the Galactica. The jump ends, and Roslin's vision ends. During subsequent jumps the vision recurs. Roslin and Elosha walk through the ship, eventually reaching the sick bay where they see a version of Roslin dying alone of her cancer. Again, the vision ends when the jump ends. The Hybrid continues to jump the basestar, and the Leader of the Number Eights theorizes that the Hybrid is completing its mission and bringing the basestar to the Hub, so that the resurrection technology of the Cylons can be destroyed. She also determines that the Hybrid detected the death of the Six known as Natalie and panicked, causing her to jump the Basestar. However, due to the Hybrid hooking itself into all of the Basestar's systems, it can no longer be disconnected.

Gaius Baltar, one of the Sixes, and an Eight believe that the Hybrid is panicking. Baltar's attempts to talk to the Hybrid seem to calm it somewhat, but Roslin's attempts to do the same do not. Baltar criticizes Roslin for speaking "at" the Hybrid rather than to it. Roslin attempts to calm the Hybrid again, speaking to it more humanely, and the Hybrid seems to calm down even further.

The jumps continue, as do Roslin's visions during the jumps. Roslin and Elosha discuss death and dying.  The periods between jumps become somewhat lengthy.  During one such period, Capt. Karl "Helo" Agathon discusses the mission with the Leader of the Eights.  He and the Eight conclude that only by using the Galactica's Viper ships—several of which were trapped aboard the basestar when it jumped away from the Colonial Fleet—can they hope to destroy the Hub. They conceive a plan. When Helo shows signs of stress, the Eight massages his shoulders just as his wife, Sharon "Athena" Agathon has done. Helo is surprised at her actions, but the Eight reveals that she downloaded many of Athena's memories after Athena used the resurrection ship technology (an event which occurred during the Season 3 episode, Rapture). Helo finds himself emotionally drawn to the Eight.

Aboard the Hub, the Cylon known as Brother Cavil "unboxes" or reactivates the Number Three known as D'Anna Biers. All Number Threes were deactivated and their memories isolated and stored in the third season episode Rapture. But now Cavil uses the resurrection technology to reactivate Biers.  Cavil reveals that civil war has broken out among the Cylons, with the Eights, Sixes and Twos opposing the Fours, Fives and Ones. Biers is surprised to see Sharon "Boomer" Valerii having defected to join the Ones. Biers expresses surprise that Cavil does not want to know the identity of the Final Five Cylons. Cavil says his mind has not changed on that subject, and that the identity of the Final Five must remain hidden. He merely wants to know if Biers and the Threes will help end the civil war.

Meanwhile, Roslin continues to communicate with the Hybrid during periods between jumps. Baltar asserts that only he can communicate with it, but Roslin seems able to glean information from it as well. Roslin tries to learn about her dream in which she and Athena run through an opera house in pursuit of the half-human/half-Cylon hybrid child, Hera Agathon, only to have a Six and Baltar pick up the girl and leave through a closed door. Although the Hybrid appears to give Roslin more clues, it quickly senses the re-activation of the Threes. This creates alarm among the humans and Cylons aboard the damaged basestar, infusing them with a sense of urgency though Helo notes it makes their job easier since they no longer have to find D'Anna a body.

During another jump, Roslin and Elosha witness Admiral William Adama, Lee "Apollo" Adama who is comforting Capt. Kara "Starbuck" Thrace, and Dr. Cottle standing a deathwatch over Roslin. Adm. Adama seems very distressed over Roslin's impending death, and Roslin and Elosha discuss what it means to die, and to die alone.

When the jump is over, Helo and the Leader of the Eights tell Roslin and the Leader of the Sixes about their plan. The Cylon Raiders and Cylon Heavy Raiders will attack any basestars around the Hub, and disable the Hub's jump drive. Meanwhile, the Vipers—all electronics and engines turned off in order to avoid detection — will be towed into battle by several Heavy Raiders. Once they close with the Hub, the Cylons will free the Vipers. The Leader of the Eights and Helo will board the Hub and kidnap the Three. Once they are clear, the Vipers will use nuclear weapons to destroy the Hub. After the meeting, President Roslin tells Helo that he must bring the Three to her first so that she can learn the names of the Final Five Cylons hiding among the humans in the Colonial Fleet. She tells him that she must know the names of the Final Five first, and that only the human race can know the way to Earth. Helo disagrees, arguing this is a betrayal of the trust they have built with the Cylons. Roslin tells him that he must put aside his feelings for the Eights and follow orders, or she will remove him from the mission. Helo agrees to do as she asks.

Roslin continues to try to talk to the Hybrid. The Hybrid's vocalizations soon lead the Cylons and humans to realize that the Number Six model known as Natalie is either wounded or dying back aboard the Galactica. This leads to murmurs of distrust among the Cylons.

Helo and the Leader of the Eights discuss the Viper towing plan with the Cylon and human pilots. Many of the human pilots express dismay, arguing that their ships will be defenseless before the Cylons. Lt. Eammon "Gonzo" Pike in particular is vocal about his anger and distrust of the plan. His complaints lead to several rejoinders by the Cylon pilots, especially the Sixes. But the Eight and Helo point out that the Cylon pilots will be fighting and dying as well. The Eight points out that there is no alternative plan, and that if the plan succeeds then the human pilots will have destroyed Cylon resurrection technology forever. This appeases the disgruntled pilots, human and Cylon.

The damaged basestar jumps to the Hub's location. Once more, Roslin has a vision during the jump. Still at her own deathbed, she and Elosha talk more about death. Elosha says that everyone values their life, even bad people like Baltar. Life is too precious for any one person to decide whether to take another's life, she counsels Roslin.  Roslin has difficulty believing her. Elosha says that is because Roslin has not allowed herself to feel in a long time, nor to love. Roslin watches Adama weep over her dead body, and her face softens.

After the jump, battle ensues. On board the hub, Biers takes the opportunity to kill Brother Cavil, and Boomer flees. Helo and the Leader of the Eights board the Hub and leave with Biers. The Viper pilots are freed on cue, and destroy the Hub with nuclear missiles once Helo, the Leader of the Eights and D'Anna are safely away.  Also, one of the two enemy Basestars is destroyed in the Hub's explosion accounting for the destroyed Basestar detected in the previous episode. During the battle, Baltar encounters a Centurion. He begins to speak to the Centurion, telling it about his beliefs in a Cylon God, the seeming enslavement of the Centurions by the humanoid models, and the need for the Centurions to take control. As the Centurion seems to become angry, a weapon strikes the Cylon basestar. The Centurion is destroyed in the explosion, and Baltar is wounded in the stomach (bleeding heavily).

Roslin discovers Baltar in the damaged corridor, and drags him to safety in another room.  She puts a field dressing on his belly wound, and injects him with morphine for the pain.  As Baltar becomes less lucid due to the drug, he tells Roslin that he carried an incredible guilt which the Cylon monotheistic god has taken away from him.  An incredulous and shaken Roslin listens as Baltar tells her that he gave the Cylons the defense codes which led to the genocide against the human race. Baltar justifies his actions by saying that the Book of Pythia tells of a Noachic flood which reinvigorated the human race. No one blamed the flood, Baltar says; likewise, he is just a flood, and no one should blame him. As Baltar slips toward unconsciousness, Roslin removes his field dressing. Baltar begins to bleed to death. Out in space in the battle, Lt. Pike declares that he is not going to put his faith in the Cylons any more, and that he has programmed his Raptor to jump repeatedly until it reaches the Fleet again. Seelix, who is nearby in a Viper, tells him not to flee. An enemy Cylon Raider attacks his ship, and a bullet pierces the front window of his ship, mortally wounding him.  Pike manages to jump his ship (the results of his jump are seen in the previous episode, Sine Qua Non). The rebel Cylons and humans land about the damaged basestar, and it jumps to safety shortly thereafter.

During the jump away from the Hub, Roslin is deeply moved to see herself die. Adama weeps as Roslin's life ends.  He says he will no longer be selfish and fight to keep her alive. As he prays that she finds true rest, he removes his wedding ring and puts it on Roslin's finger.

The jump ends. Helo takes Biers to see Roslin. The Eight tries to stop him, telling him that this is a violation of their trust and the pact the Cylons had with the human beings. But Helo tells her that he's "just following orders," and leaves with the Three.

Roslin finds herself across the room from Baltar. Realizing she may have ended his life, she rushes to put a new field dressing on his wound, and attaches an I.V. bag of fluids to his arm to help him overcome shock. Helo and Biers arrive. Biers rushes to Baltar's side, and finds that he is still alive.  She announces he will live, and Roslin is relieved.

Roslin orders Helo to leave them alone, and she asks Biers for the identities of the Final Five.  Biers declares that Roslin is herself a Cylon. Roslin is shocked, but then the Three bursts out laughing. She says that was a lie, and that she has no intention of revealing the identities of the Final Five until the basestar reaches the Fleet and safety.

The basestar jumps back to the position the Colonial Fleet had occupied before its jump at the end of the previous episode, Sine Qua Non.  William Adama, reading in his Colonial Raptor and waiting for the basestar's return, quickly powers up his ship and flies toward the basestar. He and Roslin greet one another on the basestar's flight deck. They embrace, and Roslin tells him that she loves him. Adama responds that it's "about time".

Deleted scenes
There are several deleted scenes for this episode. One featured the Rebel Basestar facing Cylon boarders when Helo, D'Anna and the Eight return. In this scene, the Eight Helo has been working with is killed by a Cavil boarder right after her confrontation with Helo. The Cavil is then killed by Helo who is distressed to realize that the Eight is dead. In the series, this particular Eight never appears again with no reason given.

Reception
Alan Sepinwall of The Star-Ledger praised Mary McDonnell's performance and was intrigued by Helo's uneasy interactions with the Eight who had downloaded Athena's memories. Lucy Lawless' return "proved worth the wait, between her casually snapping Brother Cavil's neck while still in her resurrection bath, or her snarking on all sides of the Cylon/human alliance once she was free of the Hub." Eric Goldman of IGN.com also praised McDonnell's acting in this episode, and found the episode's final scene satisfying, despite not finding it believable that Adama would have waited for Roslin. "But in and of itself, Roslin being reunited with him and proclaiming that she loved him was incredibly sweet and gratifying, considering all that has occurred between the two throughout the entire series."

Cultural references

Once again, as in The Ties That Bind episode, the Orion constellation is visible as the damaged Basestar jumps back from completing its mission to destroy the Hub.
D'Anna's line: "And with a whimper, every Cylon in the universe begins to die" is likely a reference to the final stanza in the poem "The Hollow Men" by the twentieth-century modernist poet, T. S. Eliot.

References

External links
 "The Hub" at Battlestar Wiki
 "The Hub" at Syfy
 

2008 American television episodes
Battlestar Galactica (season 4) episodes
Television episodes written by Jane Espenson